The 1994–95 NBA season was the Rockets' 28th season in the National Basketball Association, and 24th season in Houston. After winning their first championship, the Rockets went on to win their first nine games of the season. However, with increased competition in the West, management felt a change was needed to win another title. On February 14, 1995, the Rockets traded Otis Thorpe to the Portland Trail Blazers in exchange for All-Star guard Clyde Drexler, and three-point specialist Tracy Murray; Drexler and Hakeem Olajuwon were both teammates at the University of Houston in the early 1980s. The team also signed free agent Chucky Brown midway through the season. However, after holding a 29–17 record at the All-Star break, the Rockets played .500 basketball in the second half of the season, posting an 18–18 record on their way to finishing third in the Midwest Division with a 47–35 record.

Olajuwon averaged 27.8 points, 10.8 rebounds, 3.5 assists, 1.8 steals and 3.4 blocks per game, and was selected for the 1995 NBA All-Star Game, while Drexler averaged 21.4 points, 7.0 rebounds, 4.4 assists and 1.7 steals per game in 35 games with the Rockets after the trade. Olajuwon and Drexler were both named to the All-NBA Third Team. In addition, Vernon Maxwell provided the team with 13.3 points per game, while Kenny Smith contributed 10.4 points per game, and Robert Horry averaged 10.2 points per game. Off the bench, second-year guard Sam Cassell provided with 9.5 points and 4.9 assists per game, while Mario Elie contributed 8.8 points per game, and Carl Herrera averaged 6.8 points and 4.6 rebounds per game. Olajuwon also finished in fifth place in Most Valuable Player voting, and in third place in Defensive Player of the Year voting.

In the playoffs, the Rockets faced the 3rd-seeded Utah Jazz in the Western Conference First Round. The Jazz would take a 2–1 series lead, but the Rockets went on to win the series in five games. In the Western Conference Semi-finals, they faced the Phoenix Suns for the second consecutive year. After trailing 3–1, the Rockets managed to defeat the 2nd-seeded Suns in seven games to advance to the Western Conference Finals. In the all Texas Western Conference Finals, they faced the top-seeded San Antonio Spurs. Both teams lacked home court advantage in the series, only winning on the road until the Rockets won Game 6 at The Summit and advanced to the NBA Finals. In the Finals, they swept the Orlando Magic in four straight games, and won their second consecutive championship, with Olajuwon being named Finals MVP for the second straight year. As the 6th seed in the 1995 playoffs, the 1994-95 Rockets to date are the lowest seeded team in league history to win an NBA championship.

Following the season, Maxwell signed as a free agent with the Philadelphia 76ers. Maxwell had a controversial season, which involved him punching a fan during a road game against the Trail Blazers on February 6, which cost him a ten-game suspension, and leaving the team during the playoffs after being replaced with Drexler as the team's starting shooting guard. Meanwhile, Murray signed with the newly expansion Toronto Raptors, Herrera signed with the San Antonio Spurs, and rookie center Žan Tabak left in the 1995 NBA Expansion Draft.

NBA Draft

Roster

Regular season

Season standings

Record vs. opponents

Game log

Regular season

|- align="center" bgcolor="#ccffcc"
| 1
| November 4, 19947:30p.m. CST
| New Jersey
| W 90–86
| Olajuwon (19)
| Olajuwon, Thorpe (8)
| Cassell (5)
| The Summit16,611
| 1–0
|- align="center" bgcolor="#ccffcc"
| 2
| November 5, 19947:00p.m. CST
| @ Minnesota
| W 115–85
| Olajuwon (23)
| Thorpe (14)
| Maxwell (7)
| Target Center16,578
| 2–0
|- align="center" bgcolor="#ccffcc"
| 3
| November 8, 19947:00p.m. CST
| @ Cleveland
| W 100–98
| Olajuwon (21)
| Olajuwon (12)
| Cassell (9)
| Gund Arena20,562
| 3–0
|- align="center" bgcolor="#ccffcc"
| 4
| November 9, 19945:00p.m. CST
| @ Indiana
| W 109–104
| Olajuwon (43)
| Olajuwon (16)
| Cassell, Horry, Smith (5)
| Market Square Arena15,258
| 4–0
|- align="center" bgcolor="#ccffcc"
| 5
| November 11, 19946:30p.m. CST
| @ Boston
| W 102–82
| Olajuwon (26)
| Olajuwon (14)
| Horry (6)
| Boston Garden14,890
| 5–0
|- align="center" bgcolor="#ccffcc"
| 6
| November 12, 19946:30p.m. CST
| @ New Jersey
| W 100–84
| Olajuwon (31)
| Thorpe (13)
| Horry (5)
| Brendan Byrne Arena20,049
| 6–0
|- align="center" bgcolor="#ccffcc"
| 7
| November 15, 19947:30p.m. CST
| Sacramento
| W 105–99
| Olajuwon (28)
| Olajuwon (14)
| Maxwell (8)
| The Summit14,656
| 7–0
|- align="center" bgcolor="#ccffcc"
| 8
| November 17, 19947:00p.m. CST
| Chicago
| W 106–83
| Olajuwon (29)
| Olajuwon (14)
| Maxwell (8)
| The Summit16,199
| 8–0
|- align="center" bgcolor="#ccffcc"
| 9
| November 19, 19948:00p.m. CST
| @ Denver
| W 109–101
| Olajuwon (26)
| Olajuwon (13)
| Cassell (9)
| McNichols Sports Arena17,171
| 9–0
|- align="center" bgcolor="#ffcccc"
| 10
| November 22, 19947:30p.m. CST
| Portland
| L 94–102
| Olajuwon (27)
| Thorpe (10)
| Maxwell (6)
| The Summit16,611
| 9–1
|- align="center" bgcolor="#ffcccc"
| 11
| November 23, 19946:30p.m. CST
| @ Orlando
| L 94–117
| Olajuwon (27)
| Olajuwon, Thorpe (10)
| Maxwell (6)
| Orlando Arena16,010
| 9–2
|- align="center" bgcolor="#ffcccc"
| 12
| November 26, 19947:30p.m. CST
| Seattle
| L 94–98
| Maxwell (23)
| Olajuwon, Thorpe (13)
| Smith (7)
| The Summit16,611
| 9–3
|- align="center" bgcolor="#ccffcc"
| 13
| November 29, 19947:30p.m. CST
| Denver
| W 96–81
| Olajuwon (27)
| Olajuwon (12)
| Smith (9)
| The Summit14,295
| 10–3

|- align="center" bgcolor="#ccffcc"
| 14
| December 1, 19949:30p.m. CST
| @ Golden State
| W 113–109
| Olajuwon (37)
| Olajuwon (13)
| Olajuwon (12)
| Oakland-Alameda County Coliseum Arena15,025
| 11–3
|- align="center" bgcolor="#ffcccc"
| 15
| December 2, 19949:30p.m. CST
| @ L.A. Lakers
| L 89–107
| Herrera (22)
| Herrera (11)
| Cassell (5)
| Great Western Forum13,056
| 11–4
|- align="center" bgcolor="#ffcccc"
| 16
| December 6, 19947:00p.m. CST
| @ Seattle
| L 90–103
| Thorpe (21)
| Horry (10)
| Cassell (7)
| Tacoma Dome13,017
| 11–5
|- align="center" bgcolor="#ccffcc"
| 17
| December 8, 19947:30p.m. CST
| Charlotte
| W 101–95
| Smith (25)
| Thorpe (15)
| Cassell, Olajuwon (8)
| The Summit12,792
| 12–5
|- align="center" bgcolor="#ffcccc"
| 18
| December 10, 19947:30p.m. CST
| San Antonio
| L 96–108
| Olajuwon (20)
| Thorpe (14)
| Maxwell (7)
| The Summit16,611
| 12–6
|- align="center" bgcolor="#ccffcc"
| 19
| December 13, 19947:30p.m. CST
| Washington
| W 93–85
| Thorpe (27)
| Olajuwon, Thorpe (14)
| Maxwell, Smith (7)
| The Summit13,889
| 13–6
|- align="center" bgcolor="#ffcccc"
| 20
| December 15, 19947:30p.m. CST
| L.A. Lakers
| L 94–97
| Olajuwon (22)
| Thorpe (16)
| Cassell (8)
| The Summit11,943
| 13–7
|- align="center" bgcolor="#ffcccc"
| 21
| December 17, 19947:30p.m. CST
| Boston
| L 109–112
| Maxwell (25)
| Olajuwon (12)
| Smith (7)
| The Summit15,757
| 13–8
|- align="center" bgcolor="#ccffcc"
| 22
| December 22, 19947:00p.m. CST
| Phoenix
| W 114–106
| Smith (25)
| Olajuwon (15)
| Maxwell, Smith (7)
| The Summit16,611
| 14–8
|- align="center" bgcolor="#ffcccc"
| 23
| December 23, 19947:30p.m. CST
| @ San Antonio
| L 96–98
| Maxwell (27)
| Thorpe (13)
| Cassell, Smith (4)
| Alamodome31,514
| 14–9
|- align="center" bgcolor="#ccffcc"
| 24
| December 26, 19946:30p.m. CST
| @ Miami
| W 101–88
| Olajuwon (24)
| Olajuwon (12)
| Maxwell, Olajuwon (5)
| Miami Arena15,200
| 15–9
|- align="center" bgcolor="#ccffcc"
| 25
| December 27, 19947:30p.m. CST
| Atlanta
| W 105–93
| Olajuwon (35)
| Olajuwon (16)
| Olajuwon (8)
| The Summit16,394
| 16–9
|- align="center" bgcolor="#ccffcc"
| 26
| December 29, 19947:30p.m. CST
| Golden State
| W 126–124
| Olajuwon (42)
| Olajuwon (8)
| Cassell (10)
| The Summit16,611
| 17–9
|- align="center" bgcolor="#ccffcc"
| 27
| December 30, 19948:00p.m. CST
| @ Utah
| W 111–103
| Olajuwon (37)
| Olajuwon (12)
| Olajuwon (7)
| Delta Center19,911
| 18–9

|- align="center" bgcolor="#ccffcc"
| 28
| January 3, 19957:30p.m. CST
| @ Dallas
| W 110–98
| Olajuwon (41)
| Olajuwon (13)
| Cassell, Maxwell (6)
| Reunion Arena17,502
| 19–9
|- align="center" bgcolor="#ccffcc"
| 29
| January 5, 19957:30p.m. CST
| Dallas
| W 108–99
| Olajuwon (33)
| Herrera, Horry (8)
| Maxwell (9)
| The Summit16,611
| 20–9
|- align="center" bgcolor="#ffcccc"
| 30
| January 7, 19957:30p.m. CST
| Indiana
| L 83–88
| Olajuwon (27)
| Olajuwon (15)
| Cassell (6)
| The Summit16,611
| 20–10
|- align="center" bgcolor="#ccffcc"
| 31
| January 11, 19957:30p.m. CST
| Miami
| W 108–97
| Smith (27)
| Olajuwon (11)
| Maxwell (7)
| The Summit12,424
| 21–10
|- align="center" bgcolor="#ccffcc"
| 32
| January 13, 19957:30p.m. CST
| San Antonio
| W 103–100
| Olajuwon (47)
| Olajuwon (10)
| Horry (9)
| The Summit16,611
| 22–10
|- align="center" bgcolor="#ffcccc"
| 33
| January 14, 19958:00p.m. CST
| @ Denver
| L 104–118
| Olajuwon (41)
| Thorpe (13)
| Maxwell (5)
| McNichols Sports Arena17,171
| 22–11
|- align="center" bgcolor="#ffcccc"
| 34
| January 16, 19957:00p.m. CST
| @ Minnesota
| L 75–94
| Olajuwon (22)
| Olajuwon (8)
| Smith (6)
| Target Center12,442
| 21–12
|- align="center" bgcolor="#ffcccc"
| 35
| January 19, 19957:00p.m. CST
| New York
| L 77–93
| Olajuwon (28)
| Olajuwon (17)
| Cassell, Maxwell, Olajuwon (5)
| The Summit16,611
| 22–13
|- align="center" bgcolor="#ccffcc"
| 36
| January 20, 19957:00p.m. CST
| @ Detroit
| W 106–96
| Olajuwon (34)
| Olajuwon (12)
| Cassell (9)
| The Palace of Auburn Hills21,454
| 23–13
|- align="center" bgcolor="#ffcccc"
| 37
| January 22, 199512 Noon CST
| @ Chicago
| L 81–100
| Horry (19)
| Olajuwon (14)
| Maxwell (5)
| United Center22,647
| 23–14
|- align="center" bgcolor="#ccffcc"
| 38
| January 24, 19957:30p.m. CST
| @ Milwaukee
| W 115–99
| Olajuwon (31)
| Olajuwon (9)
| Horry (9)
| Bradley Center14,556
| 24–14
|- align="center" bgcolor="#ffcccc"
| 39
| January 26, 19957:30p.m. CST
| @ San Antonio
| L 100–103
| Olajuwon (36)
| Olajuwon (14)
| Maxwell (5)
| Alamodome33,360
| 24–15
|- align="center" bgcolor="#ccffcc"
| 40
| January 28, 19957:30p.m. CST
| Minnesota
| W 114–93
| Olajuwon (25)
| Thorpe (9)
| Maxwell (9)
| The Summit16,611
| 25–15
|- align="center" bgcolor="#ccffcc"
| 41
| January 31, 19957:30p.m. CST
| Denver
| W 86–74
| Olajuwon (25)
| Olajuwon (13)
| Cassell (10)
| The Summit14,761
| 26–15

|- align="center" bgcolor="#ccffcc"
| 42
| February 2, 19957:30p.m. CST
| Utah
| W 121–101
| Olajuwon (40)
| Thorpe (8)
| Maxwell (10)
| The Summit16,611
| 27–15
|- align="center" bgcolor="#ccffcc"
| 43
| February 5, 19952:30p.m. CST
| @ Phoenix
| W 124–100
| Olajuwon (28)
| Olajuwon (11)
| Cassell, Maxwell (7)
| America West Arena19,023
| 28–15
|- align="center" bgcolor="#ffcccc"
| 44
| February 6, 19959:00p.m. CST
| @ Portland
| L 82–120
| Olajuwon (22)
| Olajuwon (11)
| Smith (5)
| Memorial Coliseum12,888
| 28–16
|- align="center" bgcolor="#ccffcc"
| 45
| February 8, 19959:30p.m. CST
| @ Sacramento
| W 97–86
| Olajuwon (31)
| Olajuwon (17)
| Elie (6)
| ARCO Arena17,317
| 29–16
|- align="center" bgcolor="#ffcccc"
| 46
| February 9, 19959:30p.m. CST
| @ L.A. Clippers
| L 107–122
| Olajuwon (34)
| Olajuwon (7)
| Cassell (10)
| Los Angeles Memorial Sports Arena7,178
| 29–17
|- align="center"
|colspan="9" bgcolor="#bbcaff"|All-Star Break
|- style="background:#cfc;"
|- bgcolor="#bbffbb"
|- align="center" bgcolor="#ccffcc"
| 47
| February 14, 19957:30p.m. CST
| L.A. Clippers
| W 124–104
| Olajuwon (26)
| Chilcutt (11)
| Smith (11)
| The Summit15,071
| 30–17
|- align="center" bgcolor="#ccffcc"
| 48
| February 16, 19957:00p.m. CST
| @ Charlotte
| W 105–89
| Olajuwon (29)
| Olajuwon (14)
| Cassell, Olajuwon(6)
| Charlotte Coliseum23,698
| 31–17
|- align="center" bgcolor="#ccffcc"
| 49
| February 17, 19956:30p.m. CST
| @ Washington
| W 109–92
| Olajuwon (30)
| Chilcutt (14)
| Drexler (9)
| USAir Arena18,756
| 32–17
|- align="center" bgcolor="#ffcccc"
| 50
| February 19, 199512 Noon EST
| @ New York
| L 117–122
| Olajuwon (27)
| Drexler (10)
| Cassell (10)
| Madison Square Garden19,763
| 32–18
|- align="center" bgcolor="#ffcccc"
| 51
| February 21, 19957:00p.m. CST
| San Antonio
| L 97–98
| Olajuwon (30)
| Olajuwon (10)
| Cassell (9)
| The Summit16,611
| 32–19
|- align="center" bgcolor="#ccffcc"
| 52
| February 23, 19957:30p.m. CST
| Detroit
| W 110–99
| Olajuwon (36)
| Olajuwon (12)
| Horry (9)
| The Summit16,611
| 33–19
|- align="center" bgcolor="#ccffcc"
| 53
| February 25, 19957:30p.m. CST
| Golden State
| W 112–105
| Olajuwon (38)
| Olajuwon (15)
| Cassell (16)
| The Summit16,611
| 34–19
|- align="center" bgcolor="#ccffcc"
| 54
| February 27, 19957:30p.m. CST
| Cleveland
| W 86–78
| Olajuwon (20)
| Olajuwon (11)
| Cassell, Olajuwon (6)
| The Summit14,253
| 35–19
|- align="center" bgcolor="#ffcccc"
| 55
| February 28, 19957:30p.m. CST
| @ Dallas
| L 101–102
| Drexler (24)
| Brown (10)
| Drexler (6)
| Reunion Arena17,502
| 35–20

|- align="center" bgcolor="#ffcccc"
| 56
| March 2, 19958:45p.m. CST
| Orlando
| L 96–107
| Drexler (25)
| Brown (11)
| Elie (7)
| The Summit16,611
| 35–21
|- align="center" bgcolor="#ffcccc"
| 57
| March 3, 19957:00p.m. CST
| @ Minnesota
| L 105–108
| Olajuwon (28)
| Olajuwon (13)
| Cassell (8)
| Target Center17,068
| 35–22
|- align="center" bgcolor="#ffcccc"
| 58
| March 5, 199512 Noon CST
| @ San Antonio
| L 103–124
| Olajuwon (25)
| Drexler (8)
| Cassell, Elie, Maxwell, Smith (4)
| Alamodome35,818
| 35–23
|- align="center" bgcolor="#ffcccc"
| 59
| March 7, 19957:00p.m. CST
| Phoenix
| L 102–113
| Olajuwon (40)
| Olajuwon (13)
| Smith (7)
| The Summit16,611
| 35–24
|- align="center" bgcolor="#ccffcc"
| 60
| March 11, 19957:30p.m. CST
| Dallas
| W 109–102
| Drexler (36)
| Olajuwon (12)
| Cassell (6)
| The Summit16,611
| 36–24
|- align="center" bgcolor="#ccffcc"
| 61
| March 13, 19956:30p.m. CST
| @ Atlanta
| W 97–86
| Olajuwon (31)
| Harrera, Olajuwon (11)
| Cassell, Maxwell (6)
| The Omni11,746
| 37–24
|- align="center" bgcolor="#ccffcc"
| 62
| March 14, 19956:30p.m. CST
| @ Philadelphia
| W 136–107
| Drexler (26)
| Brown (10)
| Smith (9)
| CoreStates Spectrum11,484
| 38–24
|- align="center" bgcolor="#ccffcc"
| 63
| March 16, 19957:30p.m. CST
| Minnesota
| W 104–97
| Smith (23)
| Herrera (9)
| Drexler (6)
| The Summit10,711
| 39–24
|- align="center" bgcolor="#ccffcc"
| 64
| March 19, 19952:30p.m. CST
| Philadelphia
| W 114–103
| Olajuwon (24)
| Herrera, Olajuwon (9)
| Cassell (10)
| The Summit16,611
| 40–24
|- align="center" bgcolor="#ffcccc"
| 65
| March 21, 19957:30p.m. CST
| Seattle
| L 102–104
| Drexler (22)
| Brown, Olajuwon (8)
| Drexler (6)
| The Summit16,611
| 40–25
|- align="center" bgcolor="#ffcccc"
| 66
| March 23, 19957:30p.m. CST
| Utah
| L 104–112
| Olajuwon (33)
| Drexler, Olajuwon (9)
| Olajuwon (6)
| The Summit16,611
| 40–26
|- align="center" bgcolor="#ccffcc"
| 67
| March 24, 19958:00p.m. CST
| @ Phoenix
| W 99–97
| Smith (26)
| Olajuwon (11)
| Maxwell, Olajuwon, Smith (6)
| America West Arena19,023
| 41–26
|- align="center" bgcolor="#ffcccc"
| 68
| March 26, 19958:30p.m. CST
| @ L.A. Lakers
| L 96–107
| Drexler (21)
| Olajuwon (12)
| Drexler, Smith (4)
| Great Western Forum17,505
| 41–27
|- align="center" bgcolor="#ffcccc"
| 69
| March 28, 19957:30p.m. CST
| L.A. Lakers
| L 96–106
| Herrera (22)
| Chilcutt (8)
| Drexler, Smith (8)
| The Summit16,611
| 41–28
|- align="center" bgcolor="#ccffcc"
| 70
| March 30, 19959:30p.m. CST
| @ L.A. Clippers
| W 108–96
| Drexler (41)
| Drexler (18)
| Cassell, Drexler (4)
| Los Angeles Memorial Sports Arena11,561
| 42–28

|- align="center" bgcolor="#ffcccc"
| 71
| April 1, 19957:30p.m. CST
| Milwaukee
| L 87–93
| Drexler (23)
| Herrera (9)
| Smith (6)
| The Summit16,611
| 42–29
|- align="center" bgcolor="#ffcccc"
| 72
| April 4, 19959:30p.m. CDT
| @ Sacramento
| L 105–109
| Drexler (29)
| Drexler (8)
| Drexler, Smith (3)
| ARCO Arena17,317
| 42–30
|- align="center" bgcolor="#ccffcc"
| 73
| April 6, 19959:30p.m. CDT
| @ Golden State
| W 110–102
| Drexler (40)
| Herrera (9)
| Drexler (8)
| Oakland-Alameda County Coliseum Arena15,025
| 43–30
|- align="center" bgcolor="#ffcccc"
| 74
| April 7, 19959:00p.m. CDT
| @ Portland
| L 109–127
| Cassell (31)
| Drexler (10)
| Drexler, Horry (6)
| Memorial Coliseum12,888
| 43–31
|- align="center" bgcolor="#ccffcc"
| 75
| April 9, 19952:30p.m. CDT
| @ Denver
| W 123–120
| Drexler (34)
| Drexler (13)
| Cassell (6)
| McNichols Sports Arena17,171
| 44–31
|- align="center" bgcolor="#ffcccc"
| 76
| April 11, 19957:30p.m. CDT
| Dallas
| L 147–156 (2OT)
| Drexler, Smith (29)
| Brown (14)
| Drexler (11)
| The Summit16,431
| 44–32
|- align="center" bgcolor="#ccffcc"
| 77
| April 13, 19957:30p.m. CDT
| Portland
| W 112–99
| Olajuwon (35)
| Olajuwon (10)
| Smith (8)
| The Summit16,611
| 45–32
|- align="center" bgcolor="#ccffcc"
| 78
| April 15, 19957:30p.m. CDT
| Sacramento
| W 98–84
| Smith (18)
| Olajuwon (13)
| Smith (4)
| The Summit16,611
| 46–32
|- align="center" bgcolor="#ccffcc"
| 79
| April 17, 19957:30p.m. CDT
| L.A. Clippers
| W 121–111
| Olajuwon (30)
| Olajuwon (9)
| Cassell (8)
| The Summit16,027
| 47–32
|- align="center" bgcolor="#ffcccc"
| 80
| April 19, 19958:00p.m. CDT
| @ Utah
| L 96–115
| Olajuwon (30)
| Olajuwon (10)
| Olajuwon, Smith (4)
| Delta Center19,911
| 47–33
|- align="center" bgcolor="#ffcccc"
| 81
| April 20, 19959:00p.m. CDT
| @ Seattle
| L 101–111
| Olajuwon (26)
| Olajuwon (8)
| Cassell (4)
| Tacoma Dome18,056
| 47–34
|- align="center" bgcolor="#ffcccc"
| 82
| April 23, 19956:00p.m. CDT
| Utah
| L 97–103
| Maxwell (26)
| Tabak (8)
| Maxwell (4)
| The Summit16,611
| 47–35

Playoffs

|- align="center" bgcolor="#ffcccc"
| 1
| April 27, 19958:30p.m. CDT
| @ Utah
| L 100–102
| Olajuwon (45)
| Chilcutt (9)
| Olajuwon (9)
| Delta Center19,911
| 0–1
|- align="center" bgcolor="#ccffcc"
| 2
| April 29, 19958:30p.m. CDT
| @ Utah
| W 140–126
| Smith (32)
| Olajuwon, Horry (7)
| Smith (9)
| Delta Center19,911
| 1–1
|- align="center" bgcolor="#ffcccc"
| 3
| May 3, 19958:30p.m. CDT
| Utah
| L 82–95
| Olajuwon (30)
| Olajuwon (10)
| Horry, Smith (5)
| The Summit16,611
| 1–2
|- align="center" bgcolor="#ccffcc"
| 4
| May 5, 19958:30p.m. CDT
| Utah
| W 123–106
| Drexler (41)
| Drexler (9)
| Drexler, Smith (6)
| The Summit16,611
| 2–2
|- align="center" bgcolor="#ccffcc"
| 5
| May 7, 19952:00p.m. CST
| @ Utah
| W 95–91
| Olajuwon (33)
| Olajuwon, Drexler (10)
| Olajuwon, Cassell (4)
| Delta Center19,911
| 3–2
|-

|- align="center" bgcolor="#ffcccc"
| 1
| May 9, 19959:30p.m. CDT
| @ Phoenix
| L 108–130
| Olajuwon (18)
| Brown (6)
| Smith (10)
| America West Arena19,023
| 0–1
|- align="center" bgcolor="#ffcccc"
| 2
| May 11, 19959:30p.m. CDT
| @ Phoenix
| L 94–118
| Olajuwon (25)
| Horry (8)
| Drexler (7)
| America West Arena19,023
| 0–2
|- align="center" bgcolor="#ccffcc"
| 3
| May 13, 199512 Noon CDT
| Phoenix
| W 118–85
| Olajuwon (36)
| Olajuwon (11)
| Drexler (8)
| The Summit16,611
| 1–2
|- align="center" bgcolor="#ffcccc"
| 4
| May 14, 199512 Noon CDT
| Phoenix
| L 110–114
| Olajuwon (38)
| Horry (17)
| Cassell (9)
| The Summit16,611
| 1–3
|- align="center" bgcolor="#ccffcc"
| 5
| May 16, 19959:30p.m. CDT
| @ Phoenix
| W 103–97 (OT)
| Olajuwon (31)
| Olajuwon (16)
| Smith (7)
| America West Arena19,023
| 2–3
|- align="center" bgcolor="#ccffcc"
| 6
| May 18, 19957:30p.m. CDT
| Phoenix
| W 116–103
| Olajuwon (30)
| Olajuwon, Drexler (8)
| Olajuwon (10)
| The Summit16,611
| 3–3
|- align="center" bgcolor="#ccffcc"
| 7
| May 20, 19952:30p.m. CDT
| @ Phoenix
| W 115–114
| Olajuwon, Drexler (29)
| Olajuwon (11)
| Cassell (7)
| America West Arena19,023
| 4–3
|-

|- align="center" bgcolor="#ccffcc"
| 1
| May 22, 19957:30p.m. CDT
| @ San Antonio
| W 94–93
| Olajuwon (27)
| Drexler (12)
| Olajuwon (6)
| Alamodome33,337
| 1–0
|- align="center" bgcolor="#ccffcc"
| 2
| May 24, 19957:30p.m. CDT
| @ San Antonio
| W 106–96
| Olajuwon (41)
| Olajuwon (16)
| Elie, Cassell (7)
| Alamodome35,888
| 2–0
|- align="center" bgcolor="#ffcccc"
| 3
| May 26, 19958:00p.m. CDT
| San Antonio
| L 102–107
| Olajuwon (43)
| Olajuwon (11)
| Drexler (9)
| The Summit16,611
| 2–1
|- align="center" bgcolor="#ffcccc"
| 4
| May 28, 19952:30p.m. CDT
| San Antonio
| L 81–103
| Olajuwon (20)
| Olajuwon (14)
| Olajuwon (5)
| The Summit16,611
| 2–2
|- align="center" bgcolor="#ccffcc"
| 5
| May 30, 19958:00p.m. CDT
| @ San Antonio
| W 111–90
| Olajuwon (42)
| Horry (13)
| Cassell (12)
| Alamodome35,888
| 3–2
|- align="center" bgcolor="#ccffcc"
| 6
| June 1, 19958:00p.m. CDT
| San Antonio
| W 100–95
| Olajuwon (39)
| Olajuwon (17)
| Drexler (7)
| The Summit16,611
| 4–2
|-

|- align="center" bgcolor="#ccffcc"
| 1
| June 7, 19958:00p.m. CDT
| @ Orlando
| W 120–118 (OT)
| Olajuwon (31)
| Drexler (11)
| Smith (9)
| Orlando Arena16,010
| 1–0
|- align="center" bgcolor="#ccffcc"
| 2
| June 9, 19958:00p.m. CDT
| @ Orlando
| W 117–106
| Olajuwon (34)
| Olajuwon (11)
| Drexler (5)
| Orlando Arena16,010
| 2–0
|- align="center" bgcolor="#ccffcc"
| 3
| June 11, 19956:30p.m. CDT
| Orlando
| W 106–103
| Olajuwon (31)
| Olajuwon (14)
| Drexler, Olajuwon (7)
| The Summit16,611
| 3–0
|- align="center" bgcolor="#ccffcc"
| 4
| June 14, 19958:00p.m. CDT
| Orlando
| W 113–101
| Olajuwon (35)
| Olajuwon (15)
| Drexler (8)
| The Summit16,611
| 4–0
|-

Player stats

Regular season

Playoffs

Playoffs

West First Round

(3) Utah Jazz vs. (6) Houston Rockets: Rockets win series 3-2
Game 1 @ Delta Center, Salt Lake City (April 27): Utah 102, Houston 100 
Game 2 @ Delta Center, Salt Lake City (April 29): Houston 140, Utah 126
Game 3 @ The Summit, Houston (May 3): Utah 95, Houston 82
Game 4 @ The Summit, Houston (May 5): Houston 123, Utah 106
Game 5 @ Delta Center, Salt Lake City (May 7): Houston 95, Utah 91

Last Playoff Meeting: 1994 Western Conference Finals (Houston won 4–1)

West Conference semifinals

(2) Phoenix Suns vs. (6) Houston Rockets: Rockets win series 4-3Game 1 @ America West Arena, Phoenix (May 9): Phoenix 130, Houston 108
Game 2 @ America West Arena, Phoenix (May 11): Phoenix 118, Houston 94
Game 3 @ The Summit, Houston (May 13): Houston 118, Phoenix 85
Game 4 @ The Summit, Houston (May 14): Phoenix 114, Houston 110
Game 5 @ America West Arena, Phoenix (May 16): Houston 103, Phoenix 97 (OT)
Game 6 @ The Summit, Houston (May 18): Houston 116, Phoenix 103
Game 7 @ America West Arena, Phoenix (May 20): Houston 115, Phoenix 114

Last Playoff Meeting: 1994 Western Conference Semifinals (Houston won 4–3)

West Conference finals

(1) San Antonio Spurs vs. (6) Houston Rockets: Rockets win series 4-2Game 1 @ Alamodome, San Antonio (May 22): Houston 94, San Antonio 93 
Game 2 @ Alamodome, San Antonio (May 24): Houston 106, San Antonio 96
Game 3 @ The Summit, Houston (May 26): San Antonio 107, Houston 102
Game 4 @ The Summit, Houston (May 28): San Antonio 103, Houston 81
Game 5 @ Alamodome, San Antonio (May 30): Houston 111, San Antonio 90
Game 6 @ The Summit, Houston (June 1): Houston 100, San Antonio 95

Last Playoff Meeting: 1981 Western Conference Semifinals (Houston won 4–3)

NBA Finals

1995 NBA Finals Roster
Head Coach: Rudy Tomjanovich 
Hakeem Olajuwon    |
Clyde Drexler      |
Kenny Smith        |
Robert Horry       |
Sam Cassell        |
Mario Elie         |
Carl Herrera       |
Vernon Maxwell     |
Chucky Brown       |
Pete Chilcutt      |
Tracy Murray       |
Tim Breaux         |
Žan Tabak          |
Charles Jones      |
Adrian Caldwell    |

Olajuwon vs. O'Neal
Although both centers played well, Olajuwon is generally considered to have outplayed O'Neal. Olajuwon outscored O'Neal in every game of the series and became one of the few players in NBA history to score at least 30 points in every game of an NBA Finals series:NBA Finals Records , Basketball.com, accessed February 16, 2007.

By winning his second straight NBA Finals MVP award, Hakeem Olajuwon became the sixth player to do so on multiple occasions, joining Willis Reed, Kareem Abdul-Jabbar, Magic Johnson, Larry Bird and Michael Jordan. Olajuwon also joined Jordan as the only two players to win the award consecutively as of that time.

Series SummaryRockets win series 4–0''

Award winners
 Hakeem Olajuwon – NBA Finals Most Valuable Player  
 Hakeem Olajuwon – All-NBA Third Team

Transactions

References

 Rockets on Database Basketball
 Rockets on Basketball Reference

Houston Rockets seasons
Western Conference (NBA) championship seasons
NBA championship seasons
Hous